Victor Hooper (23 April 1905 – 3 September 1990) was an Australian cricketer. He played fourteen first-class matches for Tasmania between 1928 and 1933.

See also
 List of Tasmanian representative cricketers

References

External links
 

1905 births
1990 deaths
Australian cricketers
Tasmania cricketers
Cricketers from Tasmania